Blanket Creek is a stream in the U.S. state of Texas. It is a tributary to Pecan Bayou.

According to tradition, Blanket Creek was named from an incident when a group of Tonkawa Indians sat under blankets to stay dry during a rainstorm.

References

Rivers of Texas
Rivers of Brown County, Texas
Rivers of Mills County, Texas